James Mills Thoburn (March 7, 1836 – November 28, 1922) was an American bishop of the Methodist Episcopal Church as well as an author. He did missionary work in India.

Thoburn was born on March 7, 1836, in St. Clairsville, Ohio, and graduated from Allegheny College in Meadville, Pennsylvania, in 1857, beginning his Methodist preaching ministry that same year in the Pittsburgh Conference. He was ordained an Elder in 1858.

He went to India as a missionary in 1859 and was stationed successively at Nynee Tal, Moradabad, Lucknow, and Calcutta, where he founded Calcutta Boys' School in 1877. Preaching in both the native and European languages, he built the largest church in India at that time. As presiding Elder of the Indian Conference, he preached for some time at Simla, the summer capital of India, and was for five years editor of the Indian Witness.

After an accident, he returned to the United States in 1886. At the 1888 Methodist Episcopal General Conference, held in New York City, he was elected missionary bishop of India and Malaysia. He published the book My Missionary Apprenticeship in 1884, a history of twenty-five years in India, and a collection entitled Missionary Sermons in 1888.  Other works included The Deaconess and her Vocation (1893), Christless Nations (1894), The Church of Pentecost (1899), Life of Isabella Thoburn (1903), The Christian Conquest of India (1906), India and Southern Asia (1907), and God's Heroes Our Examples (1914).

Thoburn retired in 1908 to Meadville. He died on November 28, 1922, aged 86.

Thoburn was the uncle of YWCA leader Mabel Cratty.

See also
List of bishops of the United Methodist Church

References

Methodism:  Ohio Area (1812–1962), edited by John M. Versteeg, Litt.D., D.D. (Ohio Area Sesquicentennial Committee, 1962).

External links

 James Mills Thoburn papers, 1910-1922 at Pitts Theology Library, Candler School of Theology

Bishops of the Methodist Episcopal Church
American Methodist bishops
People from St. Clairsville, Ohio
1836 births
1922 deaths
Methodist missionaries in India
American expatriates in India
Methodist writers
American biographers
Missionary educators
Founders of Indian schools and colleges
Methodists from Ohio